Izard County Consolidated High School (or ICC High School) is a comprehensive public high school located in Brockwell, Arkansas, United States. This Izard County-based school was established in 1985 and serves grades 9 through 12 in the Izard County Consolidated School District.

Izard County Consolidated High School is frequently hosts foreign exchange students. Students from various countries, such as the Czech Republic, Germany, Austria, Switzerland, Hungary, Italy, Mexico, Brazil, South Korea, Denmark or elsewhere, help American students to develop international relations. It also helps to better understand foreign nationalities and their habits.

Academics 
ICC High School is accredited by the Arkansas Department of Education (ADE) and has been accredited by AdvancED since 1992. The assumed course of study follows the Smart Core curriculum developed by the ADE. Students complete regular (core and elective) and career focus coursework and exams and may take Advanced Placement (AP) courses and exams with the opportunity to receive college credit.

Extracurricular activities 
The Izard County Consolidated High School mascot and athletic emblem is the Cougar with black and gray serving as the school colors.

Athletics 
The ICC Cougars compete in interscholastic activities within the 1A Classification via the 1A 2 North Conference, as administered by the Arkansas Activities Association. The Cougars participate in volleyball, bowling (boys'/girls'), golf (boys'/girls'), cross country (boys'/girls'), basketball (boys'/girls'), baseball, softball, and track and field (boys'/girls'). The school formally offered cheer.

Athletically, the high school teams have excelled in recent years (post 2000). The boys' basketball team won the Class 1A state championship in 2008 and had an overall record of 35-6 including a 26–0 record against Class 1A teams. The girls' golf team was regional champions and state runner-up in 2009 and had two players named all-state. The boys' golf team also had a player named all-state in 2009. The boys' baseball team was regional champions in 2008 and the softball team was regional runner-up in 2009 and has been a fixture in the state playoffs for the past several years. In the 2008 school year alone, the high school had 15 players named to an all-state team in boys' basketball, girls' basketball, baseball, softball, boys' golf, girls' golf, and girls' cross country. The middle school/high school has added archery and bowling in the 2009–10 school year.

Clubs and traditions 
According to the school's website, high school chess team has won the Class 1A-2A state chess championship seven times, most recently in 2008. The high school Quiz Bowl team has won one state championship (1995) and has been state runner-up twice (2001, 2002). The team was regional champions in 2009. The junior high team won the Class 1A state championship trophy in 2008.

The Livestock Show Team competes in the area county and district livestock.

References

External links 
 

Public high schools in Arkansas
Educational institutions established in 1985
Schools in Izard County, Arkansas
1985 establishments in Arkansas